David John Scheffer (born September 18, 1953) is an American lawyer and diplomat who served as the first United States Ambassador-at-Large for War Crimes Issues, during President Bill Clinton's second term in office. He is the Mayer Brown/Robert A. Helman Professor of Law at Northwestern University School of Law, where he directed the Center for International Human Rights from 2006 to 2019.

Scheffer received B.A.s from Harvard and Oxford University, and an LL.M. from Georgetown University Law Center. He began his legal career at the international law firm Coudert Brothers, working for a time in their Singapore office. He also served as counsel to the U.S. House Committee on Foreign Affairs. During Clinton's first term, he was initially the senior advisor to Madeleine Albright, who then served as ambassador to the United Nations. Scheffer then sat on the Deputies Committee of the National Security Council from 1993 until 1996, and then became the first Ambassador-at-Large for War Crimes Issues.

As ambassador, Scheffer participated in the creation of the International Criminal Tribunals for the former Yugoslavia and Rwanda, the Special Court for Sierra Leone, and the Khmer Rouge tribunal. He also led the U.S. negotiating team in United Nations talks on the International Criminal Court. Though Scheffer signed the Rome Statute that established the ICC on behalf of the U.S. in 2000, he was a highly vocal critic of many aspects of the court and the negotiation process. He particularly opposed the prohibition on any party making reservations to the Rome Statute and the manner in which the Statute structured the court's jurisdiction. Clinton's successor, George W. Bush, later withdrew the signature of the U.S.

Scheffer has also taught classes on international law and war crimes as a law professor at Northwestern, Georgetown, Columbia, Duke, and George Washington University. He is an endorser of the Genocide Intervention Network.

In his capacity as director of the Center for International Human Rights and afterwards, Scheffer runs the Cambodia Tribunal Monitor website, the primary source for accessing news, information, and video of trial proceedings from the Extraordinary Chambers in the Courts of Cambodia.

In December 2011, Scheffer published a memoir and history, All the Missing Souls: A Personal History of the War Crimes Tribunals about the rise of international tribunals in the 1990s.  On January 18, 2012, Scheffer was appointed by Secretary General Ban Ki-moon as the U.N. Special Expert to advise on the United Nations Assistance to the Khmer Rouge Trials.

He was awarded a 2013 Berlin Prize Fellowship at the American Academy in Berlin.

References

External links
 Cambodia Tribunal Monitor

 Faculty profile at Northwestern University Law School
 Foreign Policy article on the 2011 arrest of Ratko Mladic, "The Least Wanted Most Wanted Man"
 Foreign Policy article on enforcing the ICC's 2011 al-Qaddafi arrest warrant, "Justice League"
 David Scheffer at the American Academy Berlin as Bosch Public Policy Fellow

1953 births
Living people
United States Ambassadors-at-Large for War Crimes Issues
Clinton administration personnel
20th-century American lawyers
Alumni of the University of Oxford
American legal scholars
Duke University faculty
Place of birth missing (living people)
International law scholars
Harvard University alumni
Georgetown University Law Center alumni
Northwestern University Pritzker School of Law faculty